Heroica Nogales, more commonly known as Nogales, is a city and the county seat of the Municipality of Nogales. It is located on the northern border of the Mexican state of Sonora. The city is abutted on its north by the city of Nogales, Arizona, across the U.S.-Mexico border.

History
The independent Nogales Municipality, which included the town of Nogales, was established on July 11, 1884. The Nogales Municipality covers an area of 1,675 km2. Nogales was declared a city within the Municipality on January 1, 1920.

Battle of Ambos Nogales

The international trade that existed between the two cities greatly propelled the economic development of Nogales, Sonora, and the greater Northern Sonora region, but that did not prevent significant problems from forming in the area after the outbreak of the 1910 Mexican Revolution.

On August 27, 1918, at about 4:10 pm, a gun battle erupted unintentionally when a Mexican civilian attempted to pass through the border, back to Mexico, without checking in at the U.S. Customs house.  After the initial shooting, reinforcements from both sides rushed to the border. On the Mexican side, the majority of the belligerents were civilians upset with the killings of Mexican border crossers by the U.S. Army along the vaguely defined border between the two cities during the previous year (the U.S. Border Patrol did not exist until 1924). For the Americans, the reinforcements were 10th Cavalry and 35th Infantry soldiers, and civilians. Hostilities quickly escalated and several soldiers were killed and others wounded on both sides. The mayor of Nogales, Sonora, Felix B. Peñaloza, was killed when waving a white truce flag or handkerchief with his cane.

Due in part to the heightened hysteria caused by World War I, allegations surfaced that German agents fomented this violence and died fighting alongside the Mexican troops it was claimed they led into battle. U.S. newspaper reports in Nogales prior to the August 27, 1918 battle documented the departure of the Mexican garrison in Nogales, Sonora, to points south that August in an attempt to quell armed political rebels. Furthermore, an investigation by Army officials from Fort Huachuca, Arizona, could not substantiate accusations of militant German agents in the Mexican border community and instead traced the origins of the violence to the abuse of Mexican border crossers in the year prior to the Battle of Ambos Nogales. The main result of this battle was the building of the first permanent border fence between the two cities of Nogales. Though largely unheard of in the U.S. (and even within most of Mexico), the municipal leaders of Nogales, Sonora, successfully petitioned the Mexican Congress in 1961 to grant the Mexican border city the title of "Heroic City", leading the community's official name, Heroica Nogales, a distinction shared with the Sonoran cities of Guaymas, Caborca, and Ures, and a number of other cities in Mexico.

Escobarista Rebellion
Early in March 1929, the Escobarista Rebellion exploded in Nogales, sponsored by Obregonistas, supporters of Mexican president Álvaro Obregón, who had been assassinated on July 17, 1928. General Manuel Aguirre, commanding the rebellious 64th Regiment, took power without firing a shot, causing federales from Naco to send a daily airplane to attack the rebels. It dropped a few bombs over Nogales without doing any damage, while the rebels fought back with machine guns from the roofs without doing any damage to the airplane. There was only one casualty, a woman who was scared by a bomb explosion and had a heart attack. That same month, a hooded man appeared at night driving a tank on Morley Street on the U.S. side, then entered Mexico to help the federales in Naco. It seems that the tank had been bought in 1927 for fighting the Yaquis, but U.S. officials prohibited it from leaving the U.S., and it had been kept in a warehouse in Nogales, Arizona.

Climate

Nogales has a semi-arid climate (Köppen: BSk) with hot summers and cool winters, often presenting freezing temperatures.

Demographics
, the census reported that the City of Nogales had a population of 159,103 people, representing approximately 50% growth from 1990. By the 2005 census the official population of the city was 189,759, and that of Nogales Municipality was 193,517. At the latest census in 2010, the official numbers were 212,533 for the City of Nogales, and 220,292 for the Municipality.

The city and the municipality both rank third in the state in population, after Hermosillo and Ciudad Obregón. The municipality includes many outlying but small rural communities. The only other localities with over 1,000 inhabitants are La Mesa (2,996)  and Centro de Readaptación Social Nuevo (2,203) . Nogales is served by Nogales International Airport.

The population growth is in part due to the influx of industry that has come since the opening of the maquiladora industry through the National Industrialization Program, decades before the North American Free Trade Agreement (NAFTA). During the 90s, this economic context was, in part, held by an important Sonora state social policy by the Secretary of Urban Infrastructure and Ecology, Vernon Perez Rubio, accomplishing the city's total coverage on drinking water, with a 20-year guaranteed service. Manufacturing now accounts for 55% of the city's gross domestic product, and services are growing as well, most of this caused by the growing jobs in the city.

Nogales has experienced enormous population growth which covers the hills along the central narrow north–south valley. Dispersed among the houses, the visitor will find a mixture of factories, stores, etc. In 2006, the southern half of the city experienced a modern urbanization development including shopping malls, wide avenues, and modern housing conglomerations.

Monuments
At the center of Nogales, there is the Plaza de Benito Juárez. Here there is a statue with two leading figures designed by Spanish sculptor Alfredo Just. This is a tribute to Mexican President Benito Juárez, and the other is the "Monument to Ignorance", where a naked man who represents the Mexican people is fighting with a winged creature that represents ignorance.

Economy

Transportation
The primary commercial artery is Mexico Federal Highway 15, which links Nogales to major cities in Mexico as well as Interstate 19 at the U.S. border.

In aviation, the city is served by the Aeropuerto internacional de Nogales, which,  had no commercial airline service.

Tourism
Due to its location, Nogales is one of the most important ports of entry for U.S. tourists.  The downtown area consists of bars, hotels, restaurants, and a large number of curio stores, which sell a large variety of artesanias (handicrafts, leather art, handmade flowers, clothes) brought from the deeper central and southern states of Mexico. Local dishes commonly available in restaurants include many types of antojitos (Mexican food) such as enchiladas, tacos, burritos with carne machaca (dried meat), menudo and tamales.

Manufacturing
Maquiladoras, or manufacturing plants, employ a large percentage of the population. Nogales' proximity to the U.S. and the abundance of inexpensive labor make it an efficient location for foreign companies to have manufacturing and assembly operations. Some of the companies that have established maquiladoras in Nogales include: Continental AG, Amphenol Corporation, The Chamberlain Group, Walbro, ABB, Javid LLC.

Production and export 
Approximately 92 establishments produce foreign exports. Sixty-five of these establishments are located in seven industrial parks, which employ approximately 25,400 workers, around 50 percent of the total employed population of the municipality.  Also important to the economy is livestock for both foreign export and cattle breeding.

Agriculture 
Produce is one of Mexico's largest exports to the United States and the Mariposa Port of entry, at Nogales, is the most widely used route for produce destined for the U.S. Currently, 37% of all produce imported from Mexico to the U.S. passes through Nogales, making Nogales the largest border crossing for Mexican fresh produce. In the winter, the percentage of U.S. imported vegetables passing through Nogales jumps up to about 60%. In 2020, an estimated $3.7 billion worth of fresh produce entered the U.S. through Nogales, with significant portions originating from the Western Mexican states of Sonora and Sinaloa. As of 2021, in descending order of volume, the top commodities shipped through Nogales were tomatoes (19%), watermelon (16%), cucumbers (14%), squash (13%), bell peppers (9%), grapes (6%), chili peppers (5%), mangos (4%), honeydew melon (2%) and eggplant (2%). Going the other way, the Nogales Arizona-Nogales Sonora Port of Entry was the fourth-largest crossing point for U.S. agricultural exports to Mexico in 2020, with $1.05 billion worth of fresh fruits (34%), grains (26%), meat and meat products (9%), and fresh vegetables (8%) transported by truck and rail.

The produce industry requires facilities for the storage, packing, transport and logistics of these goods and provides many with employment on both sides of the border. November through March represent peak harvesting season and it is during these months when jobs are abundant and importation is at its highest.

Government 
The municipality of Nogales was governed by the Institutional Revolutionary Party (PRI) from 1931 to 2006, when power shifted to the National Action Party (PAN). After more than seven decades of being in power, the PRI was defeated by the PAN when the businessman and philanthropist Marco Antonio Martínez Dabdoub ran for the presidency of Nogales, and gained access to the municipal government after having won by 30,826 votes against 23,892 of his PRI opponent.

Municipal presidents

Gallery

Religion 
Since 13 March 2015, its Catedral Santuario de Nuestra Señora de Guadalupe is also the episcopal cathedral see of the Roman Catholic Diocese of Nogales. It is a suffragan of the Metropolitan Archdiocese of Hermosillo, from which its diocesan territory was split off.

In popular culture 
Nogales is discussed at length in the popular political economics book Why Nations Fail, comparing the relative success of Nogales, Arizona, north of the border to the poverty of Nogales, Sonora, to the south.

Notable people 

 Ana Gabriela Guevara, World Athletics Championship 2003 Female | World Champion in Paris 2003 and Olympic silver medalist in 2004 Olympic Games | Athenas 2004 within the 400 meters (athletics ) 
 David Zepeda, actor, singer, model and lawyer.
 Óscar Valdez, professional boxer, two-time Olympian, former featherweight world champion of the WBO,  and former WBC super featherweight world champion.

See also
 Nogales Municipality, Sonora
 Municipalities of Sonora

References

 Link to tables of population data from Census of 2005—INEGI: Instituto Nacional de Estadística, Geografía e Informática

External links

 Nogales, Ayuntamiento Digital (Official Website of Nogales, Sonora)  
 Everything you want to know about Both/Ambos Nogales - Bilingual
 Planet Nogales (Information about Nogales Arizona and Nogales Sonora)
 Nogales Sonora Website 

 
Mexico–United States border crossings
Populated places in Sonora
Populated places in the Sonoran Desert
Twin cities
1884 establishments in Mexico
Divided cities